The Roosevelt Municipal Golf Course is a 9-hole golf course located in the Griffith Park area of Los Angeles, California.

It currently measures  from the back tees.

References

Landmarks in Los Angeles
Golf clubs and courses in Los Angeles
Griffith Park